Workers' Socialist Party may refer to:

 Workers' Socialist Party (Bolivia) (1970s)
 Workers Socialist Party of Bolivia (1940)
 Workers' Socialist Party (Chile) (1940-1944)
 Workers' Socialist Party (Panama)
 Partido Socialista de los Trabajadores (Spain) (1979-1993)
 Workers and Socialist Party (South Africa)